Off-the-shelf may refer to:

 Commercial off-the-shelf, a phrase in computing and industrial supply terminology
 Government off-the-shelf
 Ready-to-wear
 Shelf corporation, a type of company
 Off the Shelf Festival, a festival of writing and reading which takes place each year in Sheffield, United Kingdom
 A product recall (the product is "taken off the shelf")

See also 
 Out-of-box